was a Taiwanese-Japanese soldier of the Imperial Japanese Army who fought for Japan in World War II and did not surrender until 1974. He was the last known Japanese holdout to surrender after the end of hostilities in 1945.

Military service
Nakamura was an Amis aborigine, born 8 October 1919. In November 1943, he enlisted in a Takasago Volunteer Unit of the Imperial Japanese Army. Nakamura was stationed on Morotai Island, in the Dutch East Indies, shortly before the Allies overran that island in the September 1944 Battle of Morotai. Allegedly, the Imperial Japanese Army declared Nakamura dead on 13 November 1944.

After the Allies captured the island, it appears Nakamura remained there with other stragglers well into the 1950s, though setting off for extended periods on his own. In 1956, apparently, he relinquished his allegiance with his fellow holdouts, and set off to construct a solitary camp consisting of a small hut in a  fenced field.

Discovery
Nakamura's hut was accidentally discovered  by a pilot in mid-1974. In November of that year, the Japanese Embassy in Jakarta requested assistance from the Indonesian government in organizing a search mission, which was conducted by the Indonesian Air Force on Morotai, leading to Nakamura's arrest by Indonesian soldiers on 18 December 1974. He was flown to Jakarta and hospitalized there.

News of his discovery reached Japan on the 27th. Nakamura decided to be repatriated straight to Taiwan, bypassing Japan. Upon his return, the Taiwanese press referred to him as Lee Kuang-hui, a name he learned of only after his repatriation. Initially, the Chinese Nationalist government on Taiwan did not receive him well, seeing him as a Japanese loyalist.

At the time, the Japanese public's perceptions of Nakamura and his repatriation differed considerably from those of earlier holdouts, such as Hirō Onoda, who had been discovered only a few months earlier and was both an officer and ethnically Japanese. As a private in a colonial unit in foreign soil, Nakamura was not entitled to a pension (due to a 1953 change in the law on pensions), and he thus received only the sum of ¥68,000 (US $227.59 at the time, US $ in  terms). This caused a considerable outcry in the press, motivating the Taiwanese government and the public to donate a total of ¥4,250,000 to Nakamura (US $ in  terms).

Five years after his repatriation, on 15 June 1979, Nakamura died of lung cancer.

See also
 Hiroo Onoda, among the last three Japanese holdouts to be found after the war, he was discovered March 1974, Lubang Island, Philippines
 List of solved missing person cases
 Shoichi Yokoi, among the last three Japanese holdouts to be found after the war, he was discovered in the jungles of Guam in 1972

References

External links
: article with a photo of Nakamura (on the right).

1919 births
1979 deaths
Amis people
Deaths from cancer in Taiwan
Deaths from lung cancer
Formerly missing people
Imperial Japanese Army personnel of World War II
Japanese holdouts
Japanese occupation of the Dutch East Indies
Japanese people of Taiwanese descent
Missing in action of World War II
Missing person cases in Taiwan
People from Taitung County
Taiwanese expatriates in Indonesia
Imperial Japanese Army soldiers